Thomson Township is an inactive township in Scotland County, in the U.S. state of Missouri.

Thomson Township was erected in 1888, and named after the local Thomson family.

References

Townships in Missouri
Townships in Scotland County, Missouri